Oliver Pötzsch (born 20 December 1970) is a German author of popular fiction, noted for being among the first writers to achieve bestselling status by publishing e-books.

Pötzsch was born in Munich. His mother was an elementary school teacher.

His works include The Hangman's Daughter, the first book in the series of the same name.

Bibliography

The Hangman's Daughter series
 The Hangman's Daughter (2008)
 The Dark Monk (2009)
 The Beggar King (2010)
 The Poisoned Pilgrim (2012)
 The Werewolf of Bamburg (2014)
 The Play of Death (2016)
 The Council of Twelve (2018)

Other works
 Die Ludwig-Verschwörung (2011)
 Die Burg der Könige (2013)
 Ritter Kuno Kettenstrumpf (2014)
 Ritter Kuno Kettenstrumpf und die geheimnisvolle Flaschenpost (2015)
 Die Schwarzen Musketiere − Das Buch der Nacht (2015)
 Die Schwarzen Musketiere − Das Schwert der Macht (2016)
 Der Spielmann: Die Geschichte des Johann Georg Faustus (2018)

References

External links
 Oliver Pötzsch's official website

Living people
1970 births
Writers from Munich
German male writers